Touch Roma (born 1 May 1993) is a Cambodian footballer who plays for National Defense Ministry in the Cambodian League and the Cambodia national team. He made his national debut at the age of 16 on 3 November 2015 in a friendly match against Brunei. He has also played for Cambodia at various youth levels.

Honours

Club
National Defense Ministry
Hun Sen Cup: 2016

References 

1993 births
Living people
Cambodian footballers
Cambodia international footballers
People from Svay Rieng province
Association football forwards